Thomas Robertson Williamson (8 February 1901 – 1 April 1988) was a Scottish footballer who played in the Football League for Blackburn Rovers, Norwich City and Stoke.

Career
Williamson was a Ship's plater working on the River Clyde before he started to play junior football for Kirkintilloch Rob Roy at weekends before signing for English First Division side Blackburn Rovers. Unfortunately, he never fitted in at Ewood Park and he returned to Scotland to sign for Third Lanark.

In 1926 Stoke City moved in and persuaded Williamson to sign for them in an attempt to gain an instant return to the Second Division. Williamson proved to be a shrewd signing by Tom Mather as he displayed his quality in his first season with Stoke winning the Football League Third Division North in 1926–27. He was almost ever-present in 1927–28 missing just two matches as Stoke had a good return to the second tier, finishing fifth. For the next two seasons Williamson forged a fine half back partnership with both Len Armitage and Harry Sellars and this trio were a vital part of Stoke's midfield towards the end of the 1920s.

In 1931 he left the Victoria Ground and joined Norfolk club Norwich City where he played for two seasons before retiring. He continued to live in Norwich until his death in 1988 at the age of 87.

Career statistics
Source:

Honours
Stoke City
Football League Third Division North Champions: 1926–27

References

Scottish footballers
Kirkintilloch Rob Roy F.C. players
Blackburn Rovers F.C. players
Norwich City F.C. players
Stoke City F.C. players
English Football League players
1901 births
1988 deaths
Third Lanark A.C. players
Association football wing halves
Sportspeople from Clydebank
Footballers from West Dunbartonshire
Scottish Junior Football Association players
Scottish Football League players